The Land of New Hope is the first full-length album by Timo Tolkki's Finnish metal opera project Avalon. The album was released on May 17, 2013 in Europe and May 21, 2013 in the US.

According to Tolkki "I sort of rediscovered myself musically in the process of making this album. I wrote the story first and started composing the music after that. My aim was to write memorable songs with good melodies that would support the story...On this album you will find a lot of different dynamics...with some songs that are fully orchestrated and sound very very big."

Tolkki plans to release a trilogy about this concept, and The Land of New Hope is the end of the story

Several heavy metal singers were invited to play the characters of the story of the album, with female vocalist Elize Ryd (Amaranthe) and vocalist Rob Rock (Impellitteri) appearing to be the main characters and singing on most of the songs. The remaining vocalists performing on the album were Michael Kiske (Unisonic, ex-Helloween), Russell Allen (Symphony X, Allen-Lande), Sharon den Adel (Within Temptation) and Tony Kakko (Sonata Arctica).

The artwork was created by Stanis W. Decker and will be released in 2 versions - regular cd and deluxe edition with a 30-minute documentary plus a promotional videoclip for the song "Enshrined in My Memory".

Story
"It’s A.D. 2055 and most big cities of Planet Earth are either flooded with tsunamis or destroyed by earthquakes and fire. The whole infrastructure and communication system has broken down. The destruction is total. A small group of survivors leaves for a quest to find a sacred place known as The Land of New Hope. It is an old fairytale that has been told since decades, but very few has actually ever believed of its existence. They travel far on a journey that is full of dangers and come across a seer who guides them further. She explains to them that The Land of New Hope does exist, but it is guarded by a Keeper and only those who are pure in heart can pass him. They wander further towards their ultimate destiny…."

Track listing

Personnel
 Timo Tolkki - Guitar, bass, keyboards
 Elize Ryd (Amaranthe) - lead vocals on #01, 02, 03, 04, 06, 09, 11
 Rob Rock (Impellitteri, ex-Axel Rudi Pell) - lead vocals on #01, 02, 04, 05, 07, 08
 Russell Allen (Symphony X) - lead vocals on #01, 02, 04
 Michael Kiske - lead vocals on #10
 Sharon den Adel (Within Temptation) - lead vocals on #06
 Tony Kakko (Sonata Arctica) - lead vocals on #05
 Alex Holzwarth (Rhapsody of Fire) - drums
 Derek Sherinian (ex-Dream Theater, ex-Black Country Communion) - Keyboards, keyboard solo on #08
 Jens Johansson (Stratovarius) - Keyboards, keyboard solo on #08
 Mikko Härkin (ex-Sonata Arctica, ex-Symfonia, Luca Turilli's Rhapsody) - Keyboards

Additional musicians
 Magdalena Lee - soprano voice
 Kimmo Blom - backing vocals
 Luca Sturniolo - backing vocals
 Sami Boman - orchestrations

Chart positions

References

External links
Timo Tolkki's official website
Frontiers Records Avalon page

2013 debut albums
Rock operas
Concept albums
Frontiers Records albums
Timo Tolkki albums